Iður til Fóta was a single released in 1981 by the Icelandic group Þeyr through Eskvímó and it was edited in 10" format. The title translates as "Moving Your Feet" but in Icelandic also forms a pun which can equally translate as "Guts at Your Feet".

This record was never reissued since the masters are believed to be lost. However, in 2001 some of its recordings appeared in Mjötviður til Fóta, a CD to commemorate the 20th anniversary of the creation of Þeyr. The title of this CD also combined the name of Mjötviður Mær (1981), the other album included.

The front and back covers

The front cover, which was designed by Hilmar Örn Hilmarsson, depicts a dancer being hypnoptized by a man who points at her and shows a geometric shape on her head. This illustration was intended to represent the hypnotizing effect of Þeyr's music towards the audience.

The back cover depicts a German inscription, here translated:
The fall of Asgard on Atlantis.
The Ragnarök of the Edda and "the thousand-year empire of God on Earth" according to Daniel, Ezekiel and John's Book of Revelation.

This text is followed by two quotations from the Bible written in Latin:
Væ væ væ habitantibus in terra. Apocalypsis VIII

Cuncta in quibus spiraculum vitæ est mortua sunt. Genesis VII

Where the first quotation refers to The Seventh Seal and means Woe! Woe! Woe to the inhabitants of the earth (Apocalypsis 8:13). The second quotation refers to The Flood and translates as follows: Everything on dry land that had the breath of life in its nostrils died. (Genesis 7:22)

These writings are complemented by an illustration of the Beinhaus (House of Bones) taken from a series of drawings of the Totentanz (Dance of Death).

10" record track listing

Cassette track listing
Length time: 28:32

Credits
Music and lyrics:
1 Magnús Guðmundsson.
2: Hilmar Örn Agnarsson and Magnús Guðmundsson.
3: Hilmar Örn Agnarsson.
4: Þeyr.

Performers:
Vocalist: Magnús Guðmundsson.
Guitars: Guðlaugur Kristinn Óttarsson and Þorsteinn Magnússon.
Bass: Hilmar Örn Agnarsson.
Drums: Sigtryggur Baldursson.

Other collaborators:
Cover design: Hilmar Örn Hilmarsson.

Notes
The tracks Bas 12 and Tedrukkin are the same as Dead / Undead and Are you Still There? that appear on the later album As Above, only here the vocal tracks were recorded in English.
The titles translate as 1.Booth Twelve, 2.Magga's Vision, 3. Tea-Drunk (or "Drunk on Tea") and 4. Aryan Reggae.

External links
Page about Þeyr
Website about the history and discography of Þeyr
Tónlist.is - Page about Þeyr. It features mp3 samples (in Icelandic).
Intravenous.de - Page about Icelandic music. It includes a section for Þeyr.
Official site of Guðlaugur Kristinn Óttarsson
Page of G. K. Óttarsson at MySpace.com
Page of Þorsteinn Magnússon at Isound.com
Page of Þorsteinn Magnússon at MySpace.com
Official site of Sigtryggur Baldursson

1981 singles
Þeyr songs
1981 songs